Nicola S Peart is a New Zealand law academic, and as of 2019 is a full professor at the University of Otago.

Academic career

After degrees from  Leiden University and University of Cape Town, Peart moved to the University of Otago, rising to full professor. Peart is a recognised expert on succession law.

Selected works 
 Chan, Tracey E., Nicola S. Peart, and Jacqueline Chin. "Evolving legal responses to dependence on families in New Zealand and Singapore healthcare." Journal of medical ethics 40, no. 12 (2014): 861–865.
 Peart, Nicola S., Alastair V. Campbell, ALEX R. Manara, Shelley A. Renowden, and Gordon M. Stirrat. "Maintaining a pregnancy following loss of capacity." Medical law review 8, no. 3 (2000): 275–299.
 Bennett, Thomas W., and Nicola S. Peart. "The dualism of marriage laws in Africa." Acta Juridica (1983): 145.
 Peart, Nicola, and David Holdaway. "Legal and ethical issues of health research with children." Childrenz Issues: Journal of the Children's Issues Centre 2, no. 2 (1998): 42.

References

Living people
New Zealand women academics
Year of birth missing (living people)
University of Cape Town alumni
Leiden University alumni
Academic staff of the University of Cape Town
Academic staff of the University of Otago
21st-century New Zealand lawyers